Palava is an integrated smart city located near Dombivli in Maharashtra state. It is developed by real estate developer Lodha and is built on a 4,500-acre land located between Thane, Navi Mumbai and Kalyan. Palava City is also referred to as the City of Opportunity. It was listed as India's No.1 smart city by Jones Lang LaSalle India's proprietary research report.

Development
By 2016, the company had sold 1,350 homes worth  within the township of Palava.
The handover of 18,026 units to the customers was completed by December 2017. The second phase of the development began in 2014.

The entire project is expected to be completed over 4 phases by the year 2025.

Population 
There are currently 2 lakh residents in this city.

Finances

References

2000s establishments in India
Mumbai
Smart cities in India
Planned cities in India
Cities in Maharashtra